Air Marshal Sandeep Singh, PVSM, AVSM, VM, (born 15 January 1963) is a retired officer of the Indian Air Force. He served as the Vice Chief of the Air Staff, succeeding Vivek Ram Chaudhari. Previously, he served as the Air Officer Commanding-in-Chief (AOC-in-C), South Western Air Command.

Career
Sandeep Singh was commissioned as a fighter pilot in the Indian Air Force on December 22, 1983. He has flying experience of over 4780 hrs of operational and test flying experience on Su-30 MKI, MiG-29, MiG-21, Kiran, An-32, AVRO, Jaguar and Mirage 2000.

A recipient of the Sword of Honor, Sandeep Singh is a qualified training instructor (A2 category). He was instrumental in the induction of Su-30MKI in the Indian Air Force.

With a long career of 37 years, he has commanded a fighter aircraft squadron, was an instructor at Air Force test pilot school and project test pilot for the Su-30MKI. Due to his proficient knowledge of the Su-30MKI platform, Sandeep Singh has been the mainstay liaison for implementation of various weapons and systems by DRDO.

He served as the Deputy Chief of Air Staff from 1 October 2019 to 30 April 2021. He has also served as Senior Air Staff Officer for the Eastern Air Command from 1 January 2019 to 30 September 2019.

He superannuated on 31 January 2023 and was succeeded by Air Marshal Amar Preet Singh.

Honours and decorations 
During his career, Sandeep Singh was commended by the Chief of Air Staff and has been awarded the Vayu Sena Medal (VM), the Ati Vishisht Seva Medal (AVSM) in 2013 and the Param Vishisht Seva Medal in 2022.

Personal life 
He is married to Kamini Singh who is President of Air Force Wives Welfare Association (Regional). The couple is blessed with two daughters.

References 

Indian Air Force air marshals
Recipients of the Ati Vishisht Seva Medal
Recipients of the Vayu Sena Medal
Living people
1963 births
Vice Chiefs of Air Staff (India)